Myropil (translit. Myropil’) is an urban-type settlement in Zhytomyr Raion, Zhytomyr Oblast, Ukraine. Population:

References

Urban-type settlements in Zhytomyr Raion
Kiev Voivodeship
Novograd-Volynsky Uyezd
Zhytomyr Raion